1532 Inari, provisional designation , is a stony Eoan asteroid from the outer regions of the asteroid belt, approximately 28 kilometers in diameter. Discovered by Yrjö Väisälä at Turku Observatory in 1938, it was later named for Lake Inari in northern Finland.

Discovery 

Inari was discovered on 16 September 1938, by Finnish astronomer Yrjö Väisälä at the Iso-Heikkilä Observatory near Turku, Finland.

Orbit and classification 

Inari is a member the Eos family, one of the asteroid belt's largest families with nearly 10,000 known asteroids. It orbits the Sun in the outer main belt at a distance of 2.8–3.2 AU once every 5 years and 3 months (1,903 days). Its orbit has an eccentricity of 0.05 and an inclination of 9° with respect to the ecliptic.

Physical characteristics 

In the Tholen classification, Saimaa is a featureless stony S-type asteroid. The overall spectral type for members of the Eos family is that of a K-type.

Rotation period 

In January 2008, a fragmentary rotational lightcurve of Inari was obtained from photometric observations by French amateur astronomer René Roy. Lightcurve analysis gave a longer-than-average rotation period of 25 hours with a low brightness amplitude of 0.09 magnitude. As of 2017, no secure period has been obtained.

Diameter and albedo 

According to the surveys carried out by the Japanese Akari satellite and the NEOWISE mission of NASA's Wide-field Infrared Survey Explorer, Inari measures between 24.439 and 30.39 kilometers in diameter and its surface has an albedo between 0.060 and 0.087. The Collaborative Asteroid Lightcurve Link derives an albedo of 0.1049 and a diameter of 28.38 kilometers based on an absolute magnitude of 10.8.

Naming 

This minor planet was named after Lake Inari (Inarijärvi), located north of the Arctic Circle in Lapland, Finland. Lake Inari is the country's third-largest lake and one of the largest lakes in Europe.

The official  was published by the Minor Planet Center on 20 February 1976.

References

External links 
 Asteroid Lightcurve Database (LCDB), query form (info )
 Dictionary of Minor Planet Names, Google books
 Asteroids and comets rotation curves, CdR – Observatoire de Genève, Raoul Behrend
 Discovery Circumstances: Numbered Minor Planets (1)-(5000) – Minor Planet Center
 
 

001532
Discoveries by Yrjö Väisälä
Named minor planets
001532
19380916